Levi Walter Mengel (September 27, 1868 – February 3, 1941) was an entomologist from Reading, Pennsylvania. He was director of the Reading Public Museum. He was a member of the Peary expedition to Greenland of 1891–92.

Biography
He was born on September 27, 1868 to  Matthias Schoener Mengel and Amelie Matilde Soder. He died on February 3, 1941.

References

1868 births
1941 deaths
American entomologists
People from Reading, Pennsylvania